Erdal İnönü (6 June 1926 – 31 October 2007) was a Turkish theoretical physicist and politician, who served as the interim Prime Minister of Turkey between 16 May and 25 June 1993. He also served as the Deputy Prime Minister of Turkey from 1991 to 1993 and as the Minister of Foreign Affairs from March to October 1995. He served as the leader of the Social Democracy Party (SODEP) from 1983 to 1985 and later the Social Democratic Populist Party (SHP) from 1986 to 1993. He was the son of the 2nd President of Turkey, İsmet İnönü.

İnönü initially founded the SODEP in 1983 with the intention of contesting the 1983 general election. However, the National Security Council that had been established following the 1980 military coup banned İnönü from standing for office. Standing down as chairman in order to be replaced by a politician that could seek office, İnönü was succeeded by Cezmi Kartay. However, SODEP was banned completely from contesting the election, resulting in İnönü taking over as leader for a second time shortly after. His party contested the 1984 local elections and came second with 23.4% of the vote. SODEP merged with the People's Party in 1985 and İnönü became the leader of the new Social Democratic Populist Party (SHP) in 1986. In the 1986 parliamentary by-elections, the SHP came third with 22.7% of the vote and İnönü was elected as a Member of Parliament for İzmir. He was the only successful SHP candidate.

Following the 1991 general election, the SHP formed a coalition with Süleyman Demirel's True Path Party (DYP) and İnönü became Deputy Prime Minister. He briefly served as the acting Prime Minister in 1993 after Demirel was elected President. After the DYP elected Tansu Çiller as their leader and she formed a government, İnönü continued as Deputy Prime Minister until he resigned as party leader in 1993. He later served as Foreign Minister in 1995 until he stepped down as an MP in the 1995 general election.

Early life 
He graduated from the Physics Department of the Faculty of Sciences of Ankara University in 1947 and received his PhD from California Institute of Technology in 1951; with Eugene Wigner, he pioneered the study of group contractions. Upon his return to Turkey, İnönü worked at first as an assistant professor in Ankara University. Between 1964-1974, he was professor of physics and the first Chairman of the Department of Theoretical Physics at the Middle East Technical University (1960–1966). He initiated research on neutron transport during that period. Between 1969-1971, he was the Dean of the university's Faculty of Art and Sciences. He served as president of METU between 1970-1971. In 1974, İnönü moved to Boğaziçi University in Istanbul and lectured there until his venture into politics when he founded the Social Democracy Party (SODEP) in 1983. While at Boğaziçi, he served as Dean of the Faculty of Art and Sciences between 1976 and 1982.

Political career 
Although the military government banned İnönü's party in 1983 elections, SODEP managed to survive and became the second party in 1984 local elections. In November 1985 SODEP and another party named People's Party (Halkçı Parti) formed a union, the Social Democratic Populist Party (SHP). According to consolidation agreement İnönü briefly lost his post. But he became the leader of SHP in May 1986. SHP was one of the parties which weighed the heaviest in Turkey's political scene during the late 1980s and early 1990s. İnönü challenged the liberal conservative party of Turgut Özal, ANAP, both in 1987 and 1991 elections. One of the main reasons why SHP could not win an election was the division of the moderate left votes between SHP and DSP, the party of the former CHP leader Bülent Ecevit. Erdal İnönü was also a member of the Socialist International. He joined discussions as the Deputy Chairman of the organization.

Erdal İnönü was deputy Prime Minister in the two coalition governments formed between center-right DYP and SHP, which were led by Demirel at first (from 1991 to 1993) and when Demirel became President, by Tansu Çiller, in a unity largely caused by their resentment at the time against the outgoing Motherland Party. (See 49th government of Turkey and 50th government of Turkey)

After resignation

In the summer of 1993 he announced that he would not run for the leadership of the party in the coming congress. During the 4th general congress of the party on 11–12 September 1993, he resigned from the leadership of the party and consequently he also resigned from his post in the government. Murat Karayalçın replaced him in both posts. In February 1995 SHP and recently refounded Republican People's Party (CHP) merged. Upon Erdal İnönü's suggestion the new party was named CHP. In CHP Erdal İnönü was given the title of honorary chairman. In 1995 he served as the Minister of Foreign Affairs for about six months.

Later life 
He was the 2004 recipient of the Wigner medal, given by the Group Theory and Fundamental Physics Foundation, for his contributions to group contractions. İnönü was also known for his work on the history of science in the Republic of Turkey and the Ottoman Empire. He lectured at Sabancı University and the Feza Gürsey Institute from 2004 to 2007.

Death
Erdal İnönü died in Houston, Texas, United States on 31 October 2007, where he was being treated for leukaemia. His body was flown to Turkey and was buried at the Zincirlikuyu Cemetery in Istanbul on 4 November 2007 following a state funeral held before the building of Turkish Grand National Assembly in Ankara the previous day and then an Islamic funeral in the Teşvikiye Mosque in Istanbul.

See also

Cezmi Kartay
Necdet Calp
Aydın Güven Gürkan

References

External links 
  Biography from the Ministry of Foreign Affairs
  Interview with Erdal Inonu about Physics
  Right after his death, news includes a picture gallery

1926 births
2007 deaths
20th-century prime ministers of Turkey
People from Ankara
Social Democracy Party (Turkey) politicians
Social Democratic Populist Party (Turkey) politicians
Republican People's Party (Turkey) politicians
Turkish scientists
Turkish physicists
Leaders of political parties in Turkey
Deputy Prime Ministers of Turkey
Ministers of Foreign Affairs of Turkey
Academic staff of Boğaziçi University
Academic staff of Middle East Technical University
Academic staff of Sabancı University
Ankara University alumni
Burials at Zincirlikuyu Cemetery
Deaths from leukemia
Deaths from cancer in Texas
İsmet İnönü
California Institute of Technology alumni
Rectors of Middle East Technical University
Leaders of the Opposition (Turkey)
Deputies of Izmir
Recipients of TÜBİTAK Science Award
Mathematical physicists
Members of the 49th government of Turkey
Members of the 50th government of Turkey
Children of national leaders
Turkish Kurdish politicians